Augusto Carvalho da Silva Neto (born 2 August 1996), commonly known as Augusto Neto, is a Brazilian professional footballer who plays as a forward and is currently a free agent.

Career statistics

Club

Notes

References

External links
 Augusto Neto at HKFA

1996 births
Living people
Brazilian footballers
Brazilian expatriate footballers
Association football forwards
Fortaleza Esporte Clube players
Associação Atlética Santa Rita players
Hong Kong Rangers FC players
Campeonato de Portugal (league) players
Iraqi Premier League players
Hong Kong Premier League players
Brazilian expatriate sportspeople in Portugal
Brazilian expatriate sportspeople in Hong Kong
Expatriate footballers in Portugal
Expatriate footballers in Hong Kong
Al-Mina'a SC players
Expatriate footballers in Iraq
Brazilian expatriate sportspeople in Iraq
Sportspeople from Salvador, Bahia